The chief justice of the Common Pleas for Ireland was the presiding judge of the Court of Common Pleas in Ireland, which was known in its early years as the Court of Common Bench, or simply as "the Bench", or "the Dublin bench". It was one of the senior courts of common law in Ireland, and was a mirror of the Court of Common Pleas in England. The Court of Common Pleas was one of the "four courts" which sat in the building in Dublin which is still known as the Four Courts, apart from a period in the fourteenth century when it relocated to Carlow, which was thought to be both more central and more secure for the rulers of Norman Ireland.

According to Francis Elrington Ball, the court was fully operational by 1276. It was staffed by the chief justice, of whom Robert Bagod was the first, and two or three associate justices. The Court functioned until the passing of the Supreme Court of Judicature Act (Ireland) 1877 when it was merged into the new High Court of Justice in Ireland. The last Chief Justice of the Common Pleas for Ireland, Sir Michael Morris, continued to hold the title until 1887, when he was appointed Lord Chief Justice of Ireland.

List of chief justices of the common pleas for Ireland
1274 Robert Bagod
1298 Thomas de Chaddesworth (temporary)
1298 Simon de Ludgate
1302 Sir Richard de Exeter
1308 William le Deveneys
1308 Sir Richard de Exeter
1323 Richard Willoughby
1325 Henry de Hambury
1327 Nicholas Fastolf
1329 William de Rodyard
1331 Robert de Scardeburgh
1335 Simon Fitz-Richard
1338 John de Rees
1338 Simon Fitz-Richard, second term
1341 John Gernoun
1344 Thomas de Dent
1358 Robert Preston, 1st Baron Gormanston
1378 Henry Mitchell
1380 Stephen  de Bray
1383 William de Langham
1385 John de Shriggeley
1385 Edmund de Clay
1386 John Tirel
1396 John Giffard
1396 John Fitzadam
1419 William Tynbegh
1420 John Blakeney
1424 William Tynbegh, second term
1424 John Blakeney, second term
1428 Sir James Alleyn
1430 John Blakeney, third term
1438 Robert Dowdall
1482 Thomas Plunket
1494 John Topcliffe
1496 Thomas Bowring
1498 Thomas Plunket, second term
1514 Richard Delahide
1534 Thomas Luttrell
1554 John Bathe
1559 Robert Dillon (died 1580)
1580 Nicholas Nugent
1581 Robert Dillon died 1597, first term
1593 William Weston
1594 Robert Dillon died 1597, second term
1597 Nicholas Walsh
1612 Dominick Sarsfield, 1st Viscount Sarsfield
1634 Gerard Lowther
1660 James Donnellan
1665 Sir Edward Smith (or Smythe)
1670 Robert Booth
1679 John Keating
1691 Richard Pyne
1695 John Hely
1701 Richard Cox
1703 Sir Robert Doyne
1714 John Forster
1720 Sir Richard Levinge, 1st Baronet
1724 Thomas Wyndham, 1st Baron Wyndham
1727 William Whitshed (died just after taking up office)
1727 James Reynolds 
1740 Henry Singleton
1753 Sir William Yorke, 1st Baronet
1761 Richard Aston
1765 Richard Clayton
1770 Marcus Paterson
1787 Hugh Carleton, 1st Viscount Carleton

1800 John Toler, 1st Earl of Norbury
1827 William Plunket, 1st Baron Plunket
1830 John Doherty
1850 James Henry Monahan
1876 Michael Morris

References